The United States U-20 men's national soccer team is controlled by the United States Soccer Federation. The highest level of competition in which the team competes is the FIFA U-20 World Cup, which is held every two years.

The United States' best finish came in the 1989 FIFA World Youth Championship, when the U.S. beat Iraq in the quarterfinal before losing to Nigeria in overtime in the semifinal and Brazil in the third-place match. Steve Snow tied for second in the tournament with three goals.

The U.S. reached the quarterfinals in 1993 but lost to Brazil. After missing out in 1995, the U.S. began a run of six consecutive qualifications in 1997, reaching the second round in five consecutive tournaments. Of those tournaments, the best U.S. performance came in 2003, when the U.S. reached the quarterfinal and led Argentina 1–0 in the final minutes before falling 2–1 in extra time. The U.S. also reached the quarterfinal of the 2007 Cup before losing 2–1 in extra time to Austria.

Competitive record
 Champions   Runners-up   Third place   Fourth place

FIFA U-20 World Cup

Pan American Games

CONCACAF Under-20 Championship

Honors
FIFA U-20 World Cup
 Fourth Place (1): 1989
 CONCACAF U-20 Championship
 Winners (3): 2017, 2018, 2022
 Runners-up (6): 1980, 1982, 1986, 1992, 2009, 2013

Recent results and fixtures

2022

2023

Players

Current squad
The following 19 players were named to the squad for the March 2023 friendlies.

Caps and goals are updated as of September 27, 2022, after the match against Paraguay.

Recent call-ups
The following players have been called up for the team in the past 12 months.

Top goalscorers

Coaches

See also
 United States men's national soccer team
 United States men's national under-17 soccer team
 United States men's national under-18 soccer team
 United States men's national under-19 soccer team
 United States men's national under-23 soccer team

References

External links
 
 United States U-20 at ESPN

Soc
North American national under-20 association football teams
Youth soccer in the United States
U20
U20